Punta Tempesta is a 2,679 m a.s.l. mountain of the Cottian Alps, located in Italy.

Etymology 
The name Tempesta in Italian means Storm.

Geography 

The mountain is located on a ridge which divides two sub-valleys of the Maira watershed, Vallone di Marmora (west) and Vallone di Intersile; its summit stands not faraway from the water divide between Valle Maira and Valle Grana. Punta tempesta is separated from the neighbouring Monte Tibert by the Intersile Pass (2.520 m), while heading SE Sibolet Pass (2.546 m) divides it from Punta Sibolet (2581 m). Towards North the ridge between Marmora and Intersile sub-valleys goes on with a mountain named Punta La Piovosa (in English Rainy Summit, 2.602 m).

Punta Tempesta administratively belongs to the Marmora municipality (comune).

SOIUSA classification 
According to SOIUSA (International Standardized Mountain Subdivision of the Alps) the mountain can be classified in the following way:
 main part = Western Alps
 major sector = North Western Alps
 section = Cottian Alps
 subsection = Alpi del Monviso
 supergroup =Gruppo del Chambeyron in senso ampio
 group = Gruppo dell'Oserot
 subgroup = Gruppo della Meja
 code = I/A-4.I-A.2.b

Access to the summit 
Punta Tempesta is accessible via waymarked footpaths from different locations. Among them can be cited Esischie Pass, Santuario di San Magno (in Valle Grana, 1.761 m) and Tolosano, a frazione (village) of Marmora. In the Italian scale tweir hiking difficulty is rated E (Escursionisti, namely suitable for normal hikers). Sometimes the hikers also reach monte Tibert or other nearby mountains. During winter Punta Tempesta is also a popular destination for alpine skiers or hikers with snowshoes.

References

Maps
 Istituto Geografico Militare (IGM) official maps of Italy, 1:25.000 and 1:100.000 scale, on-line version
 Istituto Geografico Centrale - Carta dei sentieri e dei rifugi scala 1:50.000 n. 7 Valli Maira-Grana-Stura

Photo gallery

External links 

 

Two-thousanders of Italy
Mountains of the Alps
Mountains of Piedmont